Niobium oxychloride is the inorganic compound with the formula NbOCl3. It is a white, crystalline, diamagnetic solid. It is often found as an impurity in samples of niobium pentachloride, a common reagent in niobium chemistry.

Structure
In the solid state the coordination sphere for niobium is a distorted octahedron. The Nb–O bonds and Nb–Cl bonds are unequal.  This structure can be described as planar Nb2Cl6 core connected by O–Nb–O bridges. In this way, the compound is best described as a polymer, consisting of a double stranded chain.

In the gas phase above 320 °C the Raman spectrum is consistent with a pyramidal monomer containing a niobium–oxygen double bond.

Synthesis
Niobium oxychloride is prepared by treating the pentachloride with oxygen:

NbCl5  +   O2   →   NbOCl3  +  Cl2

This reaction is conducted at about 200 °C.  NbOCl3 also forms as a major side-product in the reaction of niobium pentoxide with various chlorinating agents such as carbon tetrachloride and thionyl chloride.
2 Nb2O5  +  6 CCl4   →   4 NbOCl3  +  6 COCl2

References 

Niobium(V) compounds
Chlorides
Metal halides
Oxychlorides